Karanga-a-Hape railway station is an under construction underground railway station in Auckland, New Zealand. It is due to open in 2024 as part of the City Rail Link project. It will serve the Karangahape Road area with entrances on Beresford Square and Mercury Lane.

References

Auckland CBD
Proposed railway stations in New Zealand
Rail transport in Auckland
Railway stations in New Zealand
Railway stations located underground
Railway stations scheduled to open in 2024